Clathrulina elegans is a species of heliozoan eukaryotes in the order Desmothoracida, which are a group of organisms usually sessile and found in freshwater environments.

References

External links 

 
 

Filosa
Species described in 1867